Inge Schmitz-Feuerhake (born in Osnabrück, Germany on 28 September 1935) is a German physicist and mathematician. Her research has assessed the biological effects of ionizing radiation at low dosage levels. From 1973 and until her retirement in 2000 she was a professor in experimental physics at the University of Bremen. Much of her research concerned the  areas of radiation contamination and the effect of low level radiation exposure, as well as the diagnostic use of nuclear radiation.

Career
Her work made a major contribution to the development of biological dosimetry methods in which changes to the chromosomes in white blood cells are measured with extreme precision, by making it possible to count the concerned white blood cells under the microscope.

She wrote of her scientific findings in comprehensible language, so that they can be understood by colleagues from related disciplines and interested laypeople.

Recently, she put forward arguments against the use of mammography as breast cancer screening. Her analysis showed that precisely those women who inherited a higher risk of developing breast cancer were put at undue risk due to the radiation absorbed during the screening. Her work was praised by the medical associations of several German states.

Schmitz-Feuerhake became known in Germany for examining the rise of the number of children suffering leukemia in the surroundings of the Krümmel Nuclear Power Plant. In 1980 she examined dust in the attics of private houses in Elbmarsch and found an amount of plutonium that was not explainable by the Chernobyl disaster nor by nuclear weapons testing in the 1960s. According to her, she could prove that the found plutonium and nuclear fission products had their origin in the nuclear reactor of Krümmel. She became known as “the most well-known and likely most relentless anti-nuclear activist” against the cancer cluster Elbmarsch.

In 2003 Schmitz-Feuerhake received the Nuclear-Free Future Award for her lifetime achievement.
She is also chairman of the European Committee on Radiation Risk, a group of scientists opposing nuclear power; she was elected chairman in 2003.

Schmitze-Feuerhake is vice president of Gesellschaft für Strahlenschutz e.V. (German Society for Radiation Protection).

Selected publications

See also
Anti-nuclear movement in Germany
John Gofman
Ruth Faden
Kristin Shrader-Frechette

References

External links
List of her publications since 1995

1935 births
20th-century German physicists
20th-century German women scientists
Experimental physicists
German anti–nuclear power activists
German women physicists
Living people
Scientists from Osnabrück